Wawrzyniec Goślicki (between 1530 and 154031 October 1607) was a Polish nobleman, Bishop of Poznań (1601–1607), political thinker and philosopher best known for his book De optimo senatore (1568).

Biography
He was the son of Paweł Goślicki and Ewa Kamieniecka. Born near Płock, after studying at Kraków's Jagiellonian University and at Padua and Bologna, he entered the Roman Catholic Church. In 1569 he joined the Polish royal chancery and as a secretary served two kings, Sigismund II Augustus and Stefan Batory, and was successively appointed bishop of Kamieniec Podolski (1586), Chełm (1590), Przemyśl (1591), and Poznań (1601). Goślicki was a man of affairs, highly esteemed by contemporaries, and frequently engaged in active politics. He was also a staunch advocate of religious tolerance in Poland. It was due to his influence and to a letter that he wrote to the Pope against the Jesuits that they were prevented from establishing schools at Kraków during his reign. He was the only prelate who, in 1587, acceded to the Warsaw Confederation.

Goślicki's Latin book De optimo senatore (published during his stay in Italy in Venice, 1568) and dedicated to King Zygmunt August, subsequently appeared in four English translations: as The Counsellor ( considered inaccurate) in 1598, A commonwealth of good counsaile in 1607, The Accomplished Senator... Done into English... By Mr. Oldisworth in 1733, and most recently as The Accomplished Senator in K. Thompson's translation in 1992. The book proved immensely important in Britain among forces opposed to the Tudor monarchy; it was widely quoted and cited in opposition pamphlets and leaflets during the period leading up to the British Civil Wars of the 1640s.

In this book Goślicki shows the ideal statesman who is well versed in the humanities as well as in economy, politics, and law. He argued that law is above the ruler, who must respect it, and that it is illegitimate to rule over a people against their will. He equated godliness with reason, and reason with law. Many of the book's ideas comprised the foundations of the Polish Nobles' Democracy (1505–1795) and were based on 14th-century writings by Stanisław of Skarbimierz. The book was not translated into Polish for 400 years.

The book was influential abroad, exporting the ideas of Poland's Golden Freedom and democratic system. It was a political and social classic, widely read and long popular in England after its 1598 translation; read by Elizabeth I of England, it was also known by Shakespeare, who used his depiction of an incompetent senator as a model for Polonius in Hamlet. Its ideas might be seen in the turmoil that gripped England around the times of the Glorious Revolution. Goślicki's ideas were perhaps suggestive for future national constitutions. He never wrote that "all men are created equal," but did say, "Sometimes a people, justly provoked and irritated, by the Tyranny and Usurpations of their Kings, take upon themselves the undoubted Right of vindicating their own liberties." The book was allegedly read by Robert Bellarmine, Algernon Sydney and Thomas Jefferson (who had it in his library), but there is no evidence of a direct link with Jefferson's Declaration of Independence.

Goślicki argued that distinguished senators were more useful to a state than the king or the common people:
For the king, being alone, cannot see everything and it often happens that either he yields to desires or his emotions disturb his ability of discretion. Also an ignorant crowd without a thought and head (as a proverb says) cannot by any means possess such prudence, while the senate, composed of men distinguished by virtue, prudence, and glory of accomplished deeds is capable from its middle position, as if from an observation point, of caring for the common weal of the state, perceiving those matters which are beneficial, and freeing it from disturbances, rebellions, and dangers.

He was an influence in the framing the Polish Constitution of 3 May 1791, which historian Norman Davies calls "the first constitution of its kind in Europe".

See also

Polish–Lithuanian Commonwealth
Szlachta
Sarmatism
Andrzej Frycz Modrzewski
Andrzej Maksymilian Fredro

References

Further reading
Wenceslas J. Wagner et al., Laurentius Grimaldius Gosliscius at His Age – Modern Constitutional Law Ideas in the Sixteenth Century, in 'Polish Law Throughout the Ages'
W. J. Stankiewicz, The accomplished senator of Laurentius Gosliscius
Teresa Bałuk-Ulewiczowa, The Senator of Laurentius Goslicius and the Elizabethan Counsellor, in 'The Polish Renaissance'
Teresa Bałuk-Ulewiczowa, Goslicius' Ideal Senator and His Cultural Impact over the Centuries: Shakespearean Reflections. Kraków: Polish Academy of Arts and Sciences and Jagiellonian University, 2009.
Aleksander Stępkowski (ed.), O senatorze doskonałym studia. Warszawa: Kancelaria Senatu, 2009 (collective volume in Polish with essays by A. Stępkowski, J. Mańkowski, M.A. Janicki, R. Lollo, and T. Bałuk-Ulewiczowa).
 Szczucki, Lech (ed.). Filozofia i myśl społeczna XVI wieku. Warszawa: PWN, 1978, 314–315.

External links 
 Laurentius Grimalius Goslicius (Wawrzyniec Grzymała Goślicki) and His Treatise of the Ideal Senator by Teresa Bałuk-Ulewiczowa - this essay was compiled on the basis of monographic book Teresa Bałuk-Ulewiczowa, Goslicius' Ideal Senator and His Cultural Impact over the Centuries: Shakespearean Reflections. Kraków: Polish Academy of Arts and Sciences and Jagiellonian University, 2009.
 Works by Wawrzyniec Grzymała Goślicki in digital library Polona

Ecclesiastical senators of the Polish–Lithuanian Commonwealth
University of Padua alumni
Jagiellonian University alumni
University of Bologna alumni
16th-century births
1607 deaths
16th-century Latin-language writers
16th-century Roman Catholic bishops in the Polish–Lithuanian Commonwealth
17th-century Roman Catholic bishops in the Polish–Lithuanian Commonwealth
Bishops of Poznań
Burials at Poznań Cathedral
Roman Catholic bishops of Przemyśl
16th-century Polish philosophers
17th-century Polish philosophers
Polish political writers